Number Ones is a compilation album of recordings by Swedish pop group ABBA, released by Polar Music in 2006.

Whereas ABBA Gold pulls together 19 of the group's biggest hits and most familiar songs, Number Ones is a variation on this concept, collecting 18 tracks that were #1 hits in many of the countries where ABBA were successful. In the end, only three tracks from ABBA Gold do not make the cut: "Does Your Mother Know", "Lay All Your Love on Me", and "Thank You for the Music".

In the UK, the track list includes the full length version of "Summer Night City" (originally released on the Thank You for the Music box set) and an additional track "Ring Ring", which, oddly enough, was never a big hit in that territory.

A limited edition, also released in the UK, includes a bonus disc with 12 tracks from ABBA's #1 albums.

In Taiwan, a hidden track follows "I Have a Dream". This hidden track, titled "ABBA Remix" and running for 3:31, is a medley of the choruses of the 18 songs on the CD.

Track listing

International track listing
 "Gimme! Gimme! Gimme! (A Man After Midnight)"
 "Mamma Mia"
 "Dancing Queen"
 "Super Trouper"
 "SOS"
 "Summer Night City"
 "Money, Money, Money"
 "The Winner Takes It All"
 "Chiquitita"
 "One of Us"
 "Knowing Me, Knowing You"
 "Voulez-Vous"
 "Fernando"
 "Waterloo"
 "The Name of the Game"
 "I Do, I Do, I Do, I Do, I Do"
 "Take a Chance on Me"
 "I Have a Dream"

UK track listing
 "Gimme! Gimme! Gimme! (A Man After Midnight)"
 "Mamma Mia"
 "Dancing Queen"
 "Super Trouper"
 "SOS"
 "Summer Night City (Extended version)"
 "Money, Money, Money"
 "The Winner Takes It All"
 "Chiquitita"
 "One of Us"
 "Knowing Me, Knowing You"
 "Voulez-Vous"
 "Fernando"
 "Waterloo"
 "Ring Ring"
 "The Name of the Game"
 "I Do, I Do, I Do, I Do, I Do"
 "Take a Chance on Me"
 "I Have a Dream"

Limited Edition Bonus Disc: Classic Tracks from Number Ones albums
 "When I Kissed the Teacher"
 "Hole in Your Soul"
 "Dance (While the Music Still Goes On)"
 "Me and I"
 "The King Has Lost His Crown"
 "Rock Me"
 "Tiger"
 "I Wonder (Departure)"
 "Another Town, Another Train"
 "Our Last Summer"
 "Kisses of Fire"
 "Slipping Through My Fingers"

Personnel

Agnetha Fältskog - lead vocals , co-lead vocals , backing vocals
Anni-Frid Lyngstad - lead vocals , co-lead vocals , backing vocals
Björn Ulvaeus - lead vocals , co-lead vocals acoustic guitar, backing vocals
 Benny Andersson – synthesizer, keyboards, backing vocals

Charts

Weekly charts

Year-end charts

Certifications

References

2006 greatest hits albums
ABBA compilation albums
Compilation albums of number-one songs
Polar Music compilation albums
Albums produced by Björn Ulvaeus
Albums produced by Benny Andersson
Albums recorded at Polar Studios